Nasa Iyo Na Ang Lahat (lit. "Everything is With You) is a Filipino song recorded by actor and singer Daniel Padilla as the interpreter for the Philippines’ Himig Handog (lit. Song Offering) songwriting and music video competition in 2013. The song was written and composed by Jungee Marcelo. The song was included in the compilation album title, ‘’Himig Handog Ppop Love Song (2013). The digital album made available for download on mymusicstore.com.ph on January 8, 2013, while on iTunes and Amazon on January 11. Physical album released on January 17. The acoustic version was later included on his first studio album DJP and Best of ABS-CBN Summer Songs. The music video of the song released on February 4, 2013.

"Nasa Iyo Na Ang Lahat" charting at No. 1 at both Pinoy MYX Countdown and MYX Hit Chart and landed at No. 1 at the MYX Pinoy Year-End Countdown, and No. 4 at the MYX Hit Chart Year-End.

From the Himig Handog competition final night, the song received almost all special awards including MOR Listeners’ Choice Award, ABS-CBN Subscriber's Choice Award. The song won 2013 ASAP Pop Viewers Choice Awards for Pop Song, and earned nomination for Pop Music Video. The song also earned nomination at the 2014 MYX Music Awards for Favorite Song and 2013 PMPC Star Awards for Music for Song of the Year.

Background and composition

The theme of the Himig Handog 2013 contest was P-Pop Love Songs: Mga Awit at Kwento ng Pusong Pilipino (lit. P-Pop Love Songs: The Songs and Stories of Filipino Hearts). It was held at the Mall of Asia Arena on February 24, 2013. The competition consists of twelve finalists selected from the 2,500 songs submitted during the auditions. "Nasa Iyo Na Ang Lahat"  written by Jungee Marcelo was one of the twelve finalist. The interpreter of the song decided by written and music company, that's how Daniel Padilla sang the song.

Musically, the song is already catchy and bubbly – reminiscent of a Jason Mraz song – not to mention sweet and feel-good. Lyrically it tells about how the person he loves so much has everything he would ever look for in a girl and how when they're together that he feel like the luckiest person in the world. Even though they've been together for a long time he still gets chills from when he sees her and he will always be loyal to her no matter what happens because she has chosen him and he has chosen her. The music video for "Nasa Iyo Na Ang Lahat"  was released on February 4, 2013, produced by Ateneo De Manila University (ADMU). A ballad version sung by Sam Milby was used as a theme song for the movie Must Be... Love.

Commercial performance
The music video of "Nasa Iyo Na Ag Lahat" enter MYX Daily Top 10 Chart on February 5, 2013.
The song debut at No.6 and No.9 at the MYX Pinoy Countdown and MYX Hit Chart respectively. The next week, the song atop both chart for three weeks in a row. While on the Year-End Chart, "Nasa Iyo Na Ang Lahat hit No. 1 at the Pinoy MYX Countdown and No. 4 at the MYX Hit Chart The music video of the song listed as the top 3 Filipinos Trending Music Videos Of 2013.

Even not won the competition but the song won almost all special awards. These include MOR Listener's Choice, Tambayan 101.9 Listener's Choice, Star Records CD Buyer's Choice and the MYX Choice for Best Video. The song won 2013 ASAP Pop Viewers Choice Awards for Pop Song, and earned nomination for Pop Music Video. The song also earned nomination at the 2014 MYX Music Awards for Favorite Song and 2013 PMPC Star Awards for Music for Song of the Year.

Credits
 Star Music – executive producer
 Rox B. Santos – producer
 Daniel Padilla – vocals
 Jungee Marcelo – lyricist and composer

Charts

Weekly charts

Year-end charts

Release history

See also 
 Simpleng Tulad Mo

References

2013 singles
2013 songs
Daniel Padilla songs
Tagalog-language songs